Burning from the Inside is the fourth studio album by English gothic rock band Bauhaus, released in 1983 by record label Beggars Banquet.

Recording and production 

During the recording of the album, singer Peter Murphy was ill, leaving the rest of the band to undertake much of the writing and recording process without him. As evidence of how much input the rest of the band had on the album, bassist David J and guitarist Daniel Ash sang lead vocals on four of the songs. This, combined with the fact that the band started recording without Murphy, led to internal difficulties, and by the time the album was released, they had already broken up. In 2015, David J announced in a solo performance that the album's title came from an incident in which he and Ash were smoking hash in a car and the car caught fire, burning from the inside.

Reception 

Ned Raggett, writing for The Quietus in 2013, called the album "a compelling sprawl at its best, a case for fragmentation as beauty".

Track listing

Personnel 

 Bauhaus

 Peter Murphy – lead vocals
 Daniel Ash – guitar, saxophone, vocals
 David J – bass, vocals
 Kevin Haskins – drums, keyboards

References

External links 

 

1983 albums
Bauhaus (band) albums
Beggars Banquet Records albums
Albums recorded at Rockfield Studios